Up Through the Years is a compilation album by Jim Reeves, released in 1965 on RCA Victor.

According to an RCA Victor advertisement in Billboard, the album contains "12 songs that trace Jim's career."

The album spent two weeks on the top of the Billboard country albums chart in October 1965.

Track listing

Charts

References 

1965 compilation albums
Jim Reeves albums
RCA Victor compilation albums